Bahen may refer to:

 Bahen (film), a 1941 Hindi film
 Bahen Centre for Information Technology, Toronto, Canada
 Con Bahen (1909–1962), Australian rules footballer
 Gerry Bahen (1929–2012), Australian rules footballer
 John Bahen (1943–2017), Australian rules footballer

See also
 
 Bahena, a surname